Glenea aeolis is a species of beetle in the family Cerambycidae. It was described by James Thomson in 1879. It is known from Laos, Java, and Myanmar.

Subspecies
 Glenea aeolis aeolis Thomson, 1879
 Glenea aeolis laosica Breuning, 1963
 Glenea aeolis reductemaculipennis Gilmour & Breuning, 1963

References

aeolis
Beetles described in 1879